Brookfield is an unincorporated community in Tift County, Georgia, United States. Brookfield has a post office with ZIP code 31727.

History
Brookfield had its start in 1870 when a sawmill was established there. A post office has been in operation at Brookfield since 1874. The community was so named for a brook near the original town site.

References

Unincorporated communities in Tift County, Georgia
Unincorporated communities in Georgia (U.S. state)